The Akoko are a large Yoruba cultural sub-group in the Northeastern part of Yorubaland. The area spans from Ondo state to Edo state in southwest Nigeria. The Akokos as a subgroup make up 20.3% of the population of Ondo state. Out of the present 18 Local Government Councils it constitutes four; Akoko North-East, Akoko North-West, Akoko South-East and Akoko South-West, as well as the Akoko Edo LGA of Edo State. The Adekunle Ajasin University, a state owned university with a capacity for about 20,000 tertiary education students and more than 50 departments in seven faculties is located in Akungba-Akoko. A state specialist hospital is situated at Ikare Akoko, while community general hospitals are located in Oka-Akoko and Ipe-Akoko.

Arigidi, is a dialect cluster, It is spoken in the LGAs of Akoko North East, Akoko North West, Ekiti East, and Ijumu

Geography

Akoko comprises about 45 small towns and villages, predominantly situated in rocky outcrop areas of northern Ondo state. The rocky terrain nevertheless, may have helped the region to become a melting pot of sorts with different cultures coming from the north, eastern and southern Yoruba towns and beyond. Akoko became one of the few Yoruba clans with no distinctive local dialect.
Major Akoko settlements include; Ọkà , Ikare, Oba, Ikun, Arigidi, Ugbe, Ogbagi, Okeagbe, Ikaram, Ibaram, Iyani, Akungba, Erusu, Ajowa, Akunu, Gedegede, Isua, Auga, Ikakumo, Supare, Epinmi, Ipe, Ifira, Ise, Iboropa, Irun, Iye, Afin, Igashi, Sosan, Ipesi, Etioro, Ayegunle and Oyin. In addition to this group, there are several other autonomous communities of varying sizes.

The Akokos occupy a frontier zone of Yorubaland and are bound to the north by the Owé Okun Yorubas and the Ebira people, to the west by the Ekitis, to the south by the Owos and the Owan/Ora, and to the east by the Afemai groups.

 Ikare Akoko is the biggest city in the Akoko area with around 150,000 inhabitants as at 2008. It has an I.C.T resource centre where its people have the opportunity to connect to and communicate with other individuals across the country and around the world.
 Oka Akoko is the second largest city in Akokoland, with a population of 132,800.  It is made up of 5 distinct settlements of Ayegunle-Oka, Oke-Oka, Iwaro-Oka, Okia-Oka and Isimerin-Oka. It is notable for the Oke-Maria Catholic Grotto, a popular tourist site.
 Oba Akoko is another town in Akoko South West Local Government. Oba is the gateway to Akokoland as it is the first settlement encountered in a northward direction from the Owo community into the Akoko community.

Culture and Lifestyle
Predominant traditional occupations of the community include large scale agriculture, trading and teaching. 
The Akoko and Ekiti Yorubas have a socio-cultural value concept known as Omoluka analogous to the general Yoruba concept of Omoluabi which summarises the ethos and virtues of the ideal Akoko man or woman a person's identity of integrity or uprightness. This concept has played a significant role in the indigenous integration, interaction and administration among the people.

Towns and villages 
Several mid sized towns and settlements pepper the Akoko landscape. This is a non-exhaustive list of them.

 Ikare District
 Ikare
 Ugbe
 Arigidi District
 Arigidi
 Iye
 Agbaluku
 Imo
 Erusu
 Irun/Surulere District
 Ese
 Igbooji
 Irun
 Italeto
 Kajola
 Ogbagi
 Ojeka
 Suurulere
 Oke Agbe District
 Afa
 Afin
 Aje
 Ase
 Ido
 Oke-Agbe
 Iye
 Oyin
 Ajowa District
 Ajowa
 Eriti
 Gede-gede
 Igasi
 Akunnu/Isowopo District
 Akunnu
 Awuga
 Iboropa
 Ikakumo
 Ise
 Oka-Akoko District
 Ayegunle-Oka
 Iwaro-Oka
 Oke-Oka
Okia-Oka
Isimerin-Oka
 Epinmi -Akoko District
 Epinmi-Akoko
 Isua Akoko District
 Isua-Akoko
 Ipe Akoko District
 Ipe-Akoko
Akungba Akoko District
 Akungba-Akoko
 Eti oro
 Sosan Akoko District
 Sosan-Akoko
Ifira Akoko District
 Ayegunle
 Ifira
 Ikun-Akoko
 Oba Akoko District
 Ago Ajayi
 Ago Ojo
 Ago Oka
 Ose-Oba
 Supare Akoko District
 Abule Nla
 Ago Flower
 Ago Ori okuta
 Igbo Eegun
 Igbo Nla
Ikaram District
 Ikaram
 Ibaram
 Iyani
 Ase

Notable people
Notable members of the Akoko clan include:

 Segun Abraham is a Nigerian politician and businessman.
 Adebayo Adefarati, 1931–2007, former governor of Ondo State
 Adejoro Adeogun, b. 1967 Member of the House of Representatives of Nigeria
 Kayode Ajulo, politician, lawyer and civil rights activist
 Jones Oladehinde Arogbofa, b. 1952 former Chief of Staff to President Goodluck Jonathan, retired Nigerian Army Brigadier General.
 Bamidele Aturu, 1964–2014, a prominent lawyer and human right activist
 Roy Chicago, d 1989, a highlife musician
 Sunday Ehindero, Inspector General of Police in Ondo State 2005-2007
 T. B. Joshua, 1963–2021, of The Synagogue, Church Of All Nations
 Adetokunbo Kayode, former Minister of Justice and Attorney General of the Federation, Chairman Gemstones Miners and Marketers Association of Nigeria
 Olugbenga Omole, Member of Ondo State House of Assembly
 Joseph Oladele Sanusi, former governor, Central Bank of Nigeria
 Moses Orimolade Tunolase, Founder of the first African initiated church, the Eternal Sacred Order of the Cherubim and Seraphim

Gallery

References

Regions of West Africa by country
Geography of Nigeria
Ondo State
Populated places in Ondo State